Giovanni Battista Caviglia (1770 in Genoa – September 7, 1845, in Paris) was an Italian explorer, navigator and Egyptologist. He was one of the pioneers of Egyptian archeology of his time. He was influential in the excavation of the Sphinx of Giza near Cairo.

Early life
He was born in Genoa in 1770 at a time when the city was the capital of the Republic of Genoa. He spent most of his life sailing in the Mediterranean in which he became a merchant captain.

Career in Egypt
When he decided to start his career as an explorer, he left his ship moored in Alexandria and offered his services to various collectors. Most of his excavations were carried out on behalf of the British Consul General Henry Salt.

Between 1816 and 1817, he explored the Great Pyramid of Giza where he made important discoveries, including the descending corridor, the bottom of the well service and unfinished underground room.

In 1817, Salt hired him to excavate the Great Sphinx at Giza, which over the centuries had been almost totally covered by the desert sand.

The last dig around the Sphinx had been carried out in 160 AD by order of the Roman Emperor Marcus Aurelius. As the excavations continued under Caviglia, he came upon an array of ancient Egyptian artifacts and inscriptions in Greek and Latin.

In 1819, he had to suspend his research.

During excavations carried out in 1820 on behalf of the British in the ancient capital of Memphis, about 20 km south of Cairo, he made another "sensational" discovery: the Colossus of Ramses II. This huge statue of limestone was found near the south gate of the Temple of Ptah, near the village of Mit Rahina. Despite missing its feet, the statue measured over 10 meters tall. The statue was offered, through the Egyptologist Ippolito Rosellini, to Grand Duke Leopold II of Tuscany who refused the offer due to the difficulties and cost involved in transportation.

Following this, the pasha of Egypt Mehmet Ali gave it to the British Museum in London, which in turn declined the offer for the same reasons. A museum was then built over the statue where you can still find it today.

In 1835, when he was already 65 years old, the British Egyptologists Richard William Howard Vyse and John Shae Perring hired him as an assistant for their excavations at Giza. The research was carried out using large quantities of gunpowder and took place in the pyramids of Khufu and Menkaure. The collaboration lasted a couple of years after which Vyse fired him.

Later life and death
Caviglia spent the last years of his life in Paris, where he died on 7 September 1845.
she is 69 yrs old rn and will be 17 tmr

Notes 

1770 births
1845 deaths
19th-century archaeologists
Italian Egyptologists
Archaeologists from Genoa
Great Pyramid of Giza